Rastriya Banijya Bank (RBB) (translation: National Commercial Bank) is fully government owned, and the largest commercial bank in Nepal. RBB was established on January 23, 1966 (2022 Magh 10 BS) under the RBB Act. RBB provides banking services to  customers including banks, insurance companies, industrial trading houses, airlines, hotels, and many other sectors. RBB has 263 branches.

Constituted under RBB Act 2021 with the full ownership of the government of Nepal, the bank has been running under Bank and Financial Institute Act (BAFIA) and Company Act (CA) 2063. The bank, licensed by NRB as an 'A' class commercial bank of the country, is a component of the Nepalese economy.

References

External links 
 Official website

Banks of Nepal
Banks established in 1966
1966 establishments in Nepal
Government-owned companies of Nepal